Nashville Obsolete is the second studio album released by Dave Rawlings Machine, project consisting of guitarist Dave Rawlings with long-time partner Gillian Welch. It was released on September 18, 2015.

Track listing

References 

2015 albums
Folk albums by American artists